The 2022 Cardiff Council election took place on 5 May 2022 to elect 79 members to Cardiff Council. On the same day, elections were held to the other 21 local authorities and to community councils in Wales as part of the 2022 Welsh local elections.

The 2022 election had been postponed from 2021, and was contested under new ward boundaries, which also increased the number of seats from 75 to 79. The next election will take place in 2027, following an increase in the council term from four years to five years.

At the election, Labour maintained its overall control of the council, increasing its number of seats from 40 at the last election to 55. The Conservatives and Liberal Democrats lost ten seats and one seat respectively, to a total of 11 and 10, while Common Ground, an electoral pact between Plaid Cymru and Wales Green Party, won two seats. Propel won one seat.

Background

Postponement 
Council elections in Wales were originally scheduled for May 2021, but were delayed to avoid a conflict with the 2021 Senedd election.

The length of council term was also increased from four years to five years to avoid future clashes, meaning that, after 2022, the next council election is expected in 2027.

Ward changes
The number of councillors increased from 75 to 79 at the 2022 election, with a number of ward changes.

In October 2021, Cardiff Council accepted a number of ward change proposals for the next election made by the Local Democracy and Boundary Commission for Wales, with only slight modification. The changes gave a better parity of representation. Twenty-one wards remained unchanged. Of the other wards:
 Butetown increased from one to three councillors.
 Creigiau/St Fagans merged with the Pentyrch ward and was renamed "Pentyrch and St Fagans", with a total increase in councillors from two to three.
 Grangetown increased from three to four councillors.
 Lisvane was renamed "Lisvane and Thornhill", with the addition of Thornhill from the neighbouring Llanishen ward, and increased from one to three councillors.
 Llanishen decreased from four to two councillors following the transfer of Thornhill to Lisvane.
 Pentwyn decreased from four to three councillors.
 Pontprennau/Old St Mellons was renamed "Pontprennau and Old St Mellons".
 Radyr increased from one to two councillors.

Council term and campaign 
The Labour group have been in control of Cardiff Council since 2012.

In 2019, three by-elections (Ely, February 2019; Cyncoed, July 2019; and Whitchurch & Tongwynlais, October 2019) were called following the deaths of the sitting councillors. Plaid Cymru gained the Ely seat from Labour, while the Liberal Democrats and Conservatives held their seats in the other by-elections.

In March 2018, Cllr Neil McEvoy was expelled from Plaid Cymru after allegedly disruptive behaviour at the party's 2017 spring conference. Following the controversy, in October 2019, the three remaining Plaid Cymru councillors resigned their whips, and formed an independent group with McEvoy. McEvoy and Cllrs Keith Parry and Lisa Ford would later join McEvoy's new party Propel, while Cllr Andrea Gibson, who won the Ely by-election, was elected for Common Ground in Pentyrch and St Fagans at the 2022 election.

In November 2019, the Conservatives gained a seat in Llanishen following a by-election triggered by the resignation of the sitting Labour councillor.  In November 2021, Labour won a by-election in Heath following the resignation of an independent councillor.

The Welsh Cladiators, a residents group campaigning against fire defective buildings, hoped to stand in the Butetown ward, but ultimately did not.

Common Ground Alliance

In September 2021, Plaid Cymru and the Green Party announced an electoral pact which would see them fielding a joint slate of candidates in Cardiff. Neither party had sitting councillors: Plaid Cymru's councillors elected in 2017 had been either expelled or had quit the party. In the election, the two parties fielded a common slate of candidates, known as the Common Ground Alliance. Of the 70 Common Ground Alliance candidates, 46 were from Plaid Cymru with the remaining 24 from the Green Party.  The alliance's campaign was formally launched on 24 April 2022.

In the election, Common Ground won 17% of votes across the city, coming third behind Labour and the Conservatives. They won two seats, both in the Pentyrch and St Fagans ward, while the Liberal Democrats returned 10 councillors on a smaller share of the vote.

The Alliance's elected councillors are Andrea Gibson and Rhys Owain Livesey.

Candidates by party
A total of 358 candidates stood for the 79 seats on the council, an average of 4.5 candidates per seat. Eleven parties or alliances stood candidates, plus two independent candidates.

Both the Labour and the Conservatives stood the full 79 candidates. The Common Ground Alliance and the Liberal Democrats stood in all 28 wards, while Propel stood in 21 wards (75%) and the Trade Union and Socialist Coalition stood in 15 wards (54%).

Overview of results

|}

Ward results
* = sitting councillor in this ward prior to election

Adamsdown (2 seats)

Butetown (3 seats)

Caerau (2 seats)

Canton (3 seats)

Cathays (4 seats)

Cyncoed (3 seats)

Ely (3 seats)

Fairwater (3 seats)
Sitting councillors, McEvoy, Ford and Parry, were elected for Plaid Cymru at the 2017 election. McEvoy was expelled, Ford and Parry later resigned and sat as Independents. McEvoy later founded a new party, Propel.

In this election Labour gained two seats from Plaid Cymru, and McEvoy retained his seat representing a gain for Propel from Plaid Cymru.

Gabalfa (2 seats)

S

Grangetown (4 seats)

Heath (3 seats)
Sitting councillor, Julie Sangani, had been elected at a by-election in November 2021, following the retirement of long standing Independent councillor Fenella Bowden.

Lisvane and Thornhill (3 seats)
Candidates John Lancaster and Sian-Elin Melbourne were councillors for the Llanishen ward prior to this election.

Llandaff (2 seats)

Llandaff North (2 seats)

Llanishen (2 seats)
Boundary changes resulted in the community of Thornhill being moved out of the ward at this election (merging with Lisvane to form the new Lisvane and Thornhill ward). Prior to the election all seats were held by Conservative councillors.

Llanrumney (3 seats)

Pentwyn (3 seats)

Pentyrch and St Fagans (3 seats)
Common Ground candidate Andrea Gibson was elected as a Plaid Cymru councillor for Ely in a by-election in February 2019. Gibson left Plaid Cymru in October 2019 and later sat as an independent.

This ward was formed by a merger of Pentyrch and Creigiau/St Fagans, which both elected one Conservative councillor each in 2017. In this election, Pentyrch and St Fagans elected three councillors (a net increase of one).

Penylan (3 seats)

Plasnewydd (4 seats)

Pontprennau and Old St Mellons (2 seats)

Radyr (2 seats)

Rhiwbina (3 seats)

Riverside (3 seats)

Rumney (2 seats)

Splott (3 seats)

Trowbridge (3 seats)

Whitchurch and Tongwynlais (4 seats)

By-elections between 2022 and 2027
None as of 12/1/23

See also
 List of electoral wards in Cardiff

References

External links

Party manifestos
 Manifesto for Cardiff 2022, Common Ground Alliance
 Putting Cardiff First: A Promise of Action, Conservative Party
 Stronger Fairer Greener - Welsh Labour's Manifesto for Cardiff 2022, Labour Party
 Manifesto 2022 - Greener, fairer, safer Cardiff, Liberal Democrats
 Local Contract with Wales 2022, Propel

Cardiff
Cardiff Council elections
2020s in Cardiff